Magnagrotis oorti is a moth of the family Noctuidae. It is found in the Maule, Biobío and Aisén Regions of Chile and the  Chubut Province of Argentina.

The wingspan is 54.1 mm for males and 58.6 mm for females. Adults are on wing from January to April.

External links
 Noctuinae of Chile

Noctuinae